William Colter or Coulter (1754–1810) was a 19th-century Scottish hosier who served as Lord Provost of Edinburgh from 1808 to 1810.

Life

He was born in Edinburgh in 1754.

He had a shop and house at the head of Jacksons Close on the Royal Mile (now 217 High Street).

In 1780 he commissioned the building of Morningside Lodge (later renamed Falcon Hall) in the Morningside district. It stood on 7.3 hectares of ground between Canaan Lane and Newbattle Terrace.

He joined Edinburgh Town Council around 1800 and served as Dean of Guild from 1806 and as Lord Provost from 1808.

He was Colonel of the Edinburgh Volunteers (a militia). On 8 June 1809, in his capacity as Lord Provost, he laid the foundation stone of the new Edinburgh Asylum in Morningside.

He died in Edinburgh on 14 April 1810. He is buried in Greyfriars Kirkyard in Edinburgh. He lies beneath a table stone north-west of the church, before the lower terrace.

He died in office as Lord Provost and was succeeded by William Calder (1767-1829).

His house, Morningside Lodge was acquired by Alexander Falconer and renamed Falcon Hall, being remodelled by Thomas Hamilton in 1815. The house was last occupied by John George Bartholomew in 1909, when it was demolished. Its gatepiers were re-used at Edinburgh Zoo and its portico was re-used at Bartholomew's offices on Duncan Street in the Newington district.

Artistic recognition
He was caricatured by J Jenkins of Edinburgh around 1805 whilst still a Bailie.

Family
His eldest son Ensign William Coulter (1790-1811) died during the Napoleonic Wars.

References

1754 births
1810 deaths
Businesspeople from Edinburgh
Lord Provosts of Edinburgh
Burials at Greyfriars Kirkyard
British Militia officers